Rosemary M Morgan (born 1941), is a female former athlete who competed for England.

Athletics career
She represented England and won a silver medal in the javelin at the 1962 British Empire and Commonwealth Games in Perth, Western Australia.

She was a member of the Ilford Athletic Club.

References

1941 births
English female javelin throwers
Commonwealth Games medallists in athletics
Commonwealth Games silver medallists for England
Athletes (track and field) at the 1962 British Empire and Commonwealth Games
Living people
Medallists at the 1962 British Empire and Commonwealth Games